The 1993–94 I-Divisioona season was the 20th season of the I-Divisioona, the second level of Finnish ice hockey. 12 teams participated in the league, and TuTo Hockey won the championship. TuTo Hockey, SaiPa Lappeenranta, and JoKP Joensuu qualified for the promotion/relegation round of the SM-liiga.

Regular season

External links 
 Season on hockeydb.com

I-Divisioona seasons
Fin
2